Improving Schools is a triannual peer-reviewed academic journal that covers the field of education. The journal's editor-in-chief is Terry Wrigley (University of Edinburgh). It was established in 1998 and is currently published by SAGE Publications.

Abstracting and indexing 
Improving Schools is abstracted and indexed in:
 Academic Premier
 British Education Index
 Educational Research Abstracts Online
 ERIC
 Research into Higher Education Abstracts
 Scopus

External links 
 

SAGE Publishing academic journals
English-language journals
Education journals
Triannual journals
Publications established in 1998